Brighton Pavilion is a constituency represented in the House of Commons of the UK Parliament since 2010 by Caroline Lucas of the Green Party.

Boundaries

1950–1983: The County Borough of Brighton wards of Hollingbury, Montpelier, Patcham, Pavilion, Preston, Preston Park, Regency, St Nicholas, St Peter's, and West.

1983–1997: The Borough of Brighton wards of Hollingbury, Patcham, Preston, Regency, St Peter's, Seven Dials, Stanmer, and Westdene.

1997–2010: The Borough of Brighton wards of Hanover, Hollingbury, Patcham, Preston, Regency, St Peter's, Seven Dials, Stanmer, and Westdene.

2010–present: The City of Brighton and Hove wards of Hanover and Elm Grove, Hollingdean and Stanmer (called Hollingbury and Stanmer before 2011), Patcham, Preston Park, Regency, St Peter's and North Laine, and Withdean.

Constituency history and profile

The constituency was created in 1950 from the former two-member constituency of Brighton (one of the last remaining multi-member constituencies), for which Brighton Pavilion's first Member of Parliament, Sir William Teeling, had previously been the joint representative.

The present name is derived from the Royal Pavilion. On current boundaries, the pavilion itself is right on the South-Eastern border of the seat – the opposite side of the road is Brighton Kemptown which includes the Gay Village of St James Street, Brighton Pier and the beach eastwards. Brighton Pavilion encompasses the heart of the city, including the Georgian and Regency alleyway properties of The Lanes and the Bohemian North Laine shopping area. The developed centre of the promenade above the central pebbled beach has major entertainment venues and the city's largest hotels including the Grand Hotel and Hilton Brighton Metropole. It is a relatively affluent constituency, since average income is higher than the UK average (based upon 2001 statistics) and the unemployment rate is lower than average.

From 1950 to 1997 the seat elected Conservative MPs. In 1997, David Lepper of the Labour Party, aided by somewhat notionally favourable minor boundary changes before the 1997 general election, began service as MP for thirteen years by winning the two subsequent elections. The Conservatives' share of the vote has declined at every election there since 1979.

In July 2007, the Green Party selected Caroline Lucas to contest the seat, at which point she was a Member of the European Parliament for the South East England constituency. In November 2009, Charlotte Vere was selected as the Conservative Party candidate at an open primary attended by local Conservative Party members and residents. In January 2010, the Liberal Democrats also selected a female candidate, Bernadette Millam. Labour had selected Nancy Platts, a local campaigner and former union worker, as their candidate in June 2007.  This meant that, distinctively, all of the four leading parties in the constituency had female candidates. In 2010, Labour's share of the vote fell by 6.5%, and Lucas, by then leading the Green Party, won the seat. In contrast to national results, the Conservative and Liberal Democrat share of the vote fell.

Lucas retained the seat for the Green Party at the 2015 general election with an increased majority. Purna Sen, who held senior roles at the Commonwealth, LSE and Amnesty International, was selected to contest the seat for Labour. Clarence Mitchell, a former BBC News reporter and spokesman for the family of Madeleine McCann, was selected as the Conservative Party candidate.

For the 2017 general election, and the 2019 general election, the local Liberal Democrat party chose to not field a candidate in the seat, endorsing Lucas instead due to their shared pro-EU stance. Lucas retained Brighton Pavilion for the Green Party being returned with the biggest numerical majority for any candidate in the seat since 1959. In the 2019 election, the seat had the largest winning margin, and the highest winning vote share, of any seat not held by the Conservatives or Labour.

Members of Parliament

Election results

Elections in the 2010s

Elections in the 2000s

Elections in the 1990s

Elections in the 1980s

Elections in the 1970s

Elections in the 1960s

Elections in the 1950s

See also
 List of parliamentary constituencies in East Sussex
 Opinion polling for the next United Kingdom general election in individual constituencies

Notes

References

Sources
 Election result, 2005 (BBC)
 Election results, 1997 – 2001 (BBC)
 Election results, 1997 – 2001  (Election Demon)
 Election results, 1983 – 1992 (Election Demon)
 Election results, 1992 – 2005 (Guardian)
 Election results, 1951 – 2001 (Keele University)
  By-election result, 1969 (Geocities)
 F. W. S. Craig. British Parliamentary Election Results 1950–1973.

External links
 nomis Constituency Profile for Brighton, Pavilion — presenting data from the ONS annual population survey and other official statistics.

Politics of Brighton and Hove
Parliamentary constituencies in South East England
Constituencies of the Parliament of the United Kingdom established in 1950